Phaestus or Phaestos or Phaistos was a town of the Ozolian Locrians, with a port called the port of Apollo Phaestius. 

The site of Phaestus is tentatively placed at Kisseli Panormos.

References

Populated places in Ozolian Locris
Former populated places in Greece
Lost ancient cities and towns